Diploknema butyracea (Nepali: चिउरी, Chiuri), the Indian butter tree, is a multi purpose tree. Fat is extracted from the seeds and named chiuri ghee or phulwara butter. D. butyracea is useful for block planting and also to be grown in the ravines of hills. The latex yielding plant such as D. butyracea suits to different edapho-climatic conditions and thus does not compete with the traditional crops. It is a large tree of family Sapotaceae, flowers during cold season and fruit ripens in June–July. It commonly occurs in the sub Himalayan tract between 300-1500m from sea level.
The chiuri tree has been utilised for many uses by rural households in Nepal. Ghee is used in daily cooking, as fuel for lamps, and body lotion; the fruit is eaten fresh and use for alcohol distillation, oil-cakes are utilised as manure, and the tree itself is used as firewood, etc. It has significant cultural and livelihood associations with the Chepang community (Nepali:चेपांग) of Nepal and are given as dowry to daughters. This is not commercially farmed though.

References

butyracea
Flora of West Himalaya
Trees of Nepal
Flora of East Himalaya
Flora of Assam (region)